Come Play with Me is an album by saxophonist Charles McPherson which was recorded in 1995 and released on the Arabesque label.

Reception

The AllMusic review by Scott Yanow said "Although he had rarely played with any of the sidemen heard on his Arabesque release before, the quartet presents a unified sound, as if they were a regularly working group. ... no matter what the vehicle, McPherson is in top form throughout this fine date and he sounds clearly inspired".

Track listing
All compositions by Charles McPherson except where noted
 "Get Happy" (Harold Arlen, Ted Koehler) – 4:43
 "Lonely Little Christmas" – 9:16
 "Marionette" – 6:51
 "Pretty Girl Blues" – 7:18
 "Darn That Dream" (Jimmy Van Heusen, Eddie DeLange) – 6:35
 "Bloomdido" (Charlie Parker) – 5:54
 "Jumping Jack" – 7:13
 "Fun House" – 5:43
 "Blues for Camille" – 7:13

Personnel
Charles McPherson – alto saxophone
Mulgrew Miller – piano
Santi Debriano – double bass
Lewis Nash – drums

References

Arabesque Records albums
Charles McPherson (musician) albums
1995 albums